Puya angelensis is a species of plant in the family Bromeliaceae. It is endemic to Ecuador, where it is known from three locations in Carchi Province.

This plant grows in páramo and high Andean forest habitat. It is sometimes cultivated as a hedge because it is spiny.

References

angelensis
Endemic flora of Ecuador
Endangered plants
Páramo flora
Taxonomy articles created by Polbot
Plants described in 1990